Diplodia allocellula is an endophytic fungus that might be a latent pathogen. It was found on Acacia karroo, a common tree in southern Africa.

References

Further reading
Jami, Fahimeh, et al. "Greater Botryosphaeriaceae diversity in healthy than associated diseased Acacia karroo tree tissues." Australasian Plant Pathology 42.4 (2013): 421–430.
Jami, Fahimeh, et al. "Botryosphaeriaceae species overlap on four unrelated, native South African hosts." Fungal Biology 118.2 (2014): 168–179.

External links

Botryosphaeriaceae
Fungi described in 2012
Fungi of Africa
Fungal plant pathogens and diseases